Hillcrest is a station on the Port Authority of Allegheny County's light rail network, located in Bethel Park, Pennsylvania. The street level stop is designed as a small commuter stop, serving area residents who walk to the train so they can be taken toward Downtown Pittsburgh.

Hillcrest station is also within walking distance of Rite Aid, Dairy Queen, and Bruster's Ice Cream.

History
The grade crossing of Bethel Church Road was replaced by the Hillcrest bridge in September 1987.

References

External links 

Port Authority T Stations Listings

Port Authority of Allegheny County stations
Railway stations in the United States opened in 1987
Silver Line (Pittsburgh)